Presidential elections were held in the United Arab Republic (now Egypt) on 15 March 1965. The election took the form of a referendum on the candidacy of Gamal Abdel Nasser, who ran unopposed. He won with almost seven million votes, and only 65 against. Voter turnout was 98.5%.

Results

References

United Arab
1965 in Egypt
Presidential elections in Egypt
Referendums in the United Arab Republic
Single-candidate elections